Ring, also known as The Ring, is a Japanese horror media franchise, based on the novel series of the same name written by Koji Suzuki. The franchise includes eight Japanese films, two television series, six manga adaptations, three English-language film remakes, a Korean film remake, and two video games The Ring: Terror's Realm and Ring: Infinity.

The Ring films revolve around a cursed video tape; whoever watches the tape dies seven days later, unless the tape is copied and shown to another person, who then must repeat the same process. The video tape was created by a psychic, Sadako Yamamura, who was murdered by her adoptive father and thrown into a well. After her supposed death, she returned as a ghostly serial killer, killing anyone who fails to copy and then send the video tape to someone else under a seven-day deadline (constricted to a two-day deadline in Sadako vs. Kayako and a one-day deadline in Sadako DX).

Japanese media

Novels

The franchise began with Koji Suzuki's 1991 novel Ring. It was the first of a trilogy, with two sequels: Spiral (1995) and Loop (1998). Several later novels based on Ring were released: Birthday (1999) [which contains a prequel to Ring, an epilogue to Loop, and details what happened to a key character in Spiral, S (2012), and Tide (2013).

Films 
In 1998, Hideo Nakata made a new Japanese adaptation of the book in his film Ring (also known as The Ring or Ringu). The movie was a critical and commercial success, being credited with revolutionizing the J-horror genre and influencing many future films in the wider horror genre.

The first sequel to the 1998 film was Rasen (also known as The Spiral or simply Spiral). It was an adaptation of Spiral, Suzuki's sequel to his first Ring book. It was released on 31 January 1998, the same day as Ring. It was a critical and commercial failure compared with the first film. It was directed by George Lida, who had previously worked as the writer for the television film, Ring (1995).

A new sequel, Ring 2, was released in 1999. The film continues the storyline of Ring (1998) and ignores the events of Spiral (1998) and many cast members from the original film return. Hideo Nakata also returned to direct. This was the first film in the franchise not based on any of Suzuki's novels. While not as critically well-received as the first film, the movie was a financial success, becoming the second-highest grossing Japanese film of 1999. 

A prequel, Ring 0: Birthday, was released in 2000. The movie is based on the short story "Lemon Heart" from Suzuki's 1999 book, Birthday (the fourth book in the series). This film delved into a uniquely different mythos surrounding Sadako Yamamura and the cursed videotape.

In 2012, Sadako 3D was released, adapted from Suzuki's book S that released the same year. A direct sequel, Sadako 3D 2 was released in 2013. Both were directed by Tsutomu Hanabusa and continued the timeline established in Spiral.

In 2016, Sadako vs. Kayako, directed by Kōji Shiraishi, was released, a crossover of the Ju-on series of horror films. It features Sadakaya, a ghost that resulted from the fusion of Sadako and the Ju-on antagonist Kayako Saeki. It is not canon to either timeline and the deadline for the video tape is two days instead of seven. 

Sadako was released in 2019. It saw the return of director Hideo Nakata to the Japanese film series for the first time since Ring 2, 20 years prior. The film is loosely based on Tide, the final novel in the series.

Sadako DX, directed by Hisashi Kimura, was released in 2022. The film stars Fuka Koshiba as a college student attempting to unravel the curse of Sadako with the help of a psychic and a fortune teller.

Television
The first adaption of Ring was the Japanese television film Ring (titled Ring: Kanzenban for home video release), released in 1995. This remained the closest to the book but didn't have the success and recognition of the later films.

Ring: The Final Chapter is a 12 episode self-contained miniseries that aired in 1999, and is loosely based on the original Ring novel. It is not connected to the films or the previous television adaptation.

In the same year, a sequel television miniseries titled Rasen was made, consisting of 13 episodes.

Manga
Several manga series have been published by Kadokawa Shoten based on the films. The second manga adaptation is a two-volume series based on the first novel and the first Hideo Nakata film. The manga was written Hiroshi Takahashi and illustrated by Misao Inagaki. Both volumes were released on January 21, 1999. Dark Horse Comics compiled the first two volumes and released an english-language version on November 12, 2003. 

The third adaptation, of Nakata's Ring 2 film, was written by Hiroshi Takahashi and illustrated by Meimu, was released on February 3, 1999. Dark Horse Comics released it on May 19, 2004 as the second volume of the Ring manga series. 

The fourth adaptation, titled , is based on the novel and film of the same name. The manga was written by Koji Suzuki, illustrated by Sakura Mizuki, and released on September 10, 1999. Dark Horse released it on August 18, 2004 as volume 3 of the Ring manga series.
 
The fifth adaptation, titled , is based on the novel of the same name. The manga was written by Koji Suzuki, illustrated by Meimu and released on December 22, 1999. Dark Horse Comics released it on November 3, 2004 as volume 4 of the Ring manga series. 
 
The sixth, named "Ring 0", based on the film of that name, was also written by Hiroshi Takahashi and illustrated by Meimu, and released on January 28, 2000. Dark Horse Comics released it on March 30, 2005 as "Volume 0" of the Ring manga series.

Korean remake
The Ring Virus was the first remake to be made, in 1999, where the villain is renamed as Park Eun-suh, who is intersex, as Sadako was in the books. Though the film copied multiple scenes from Ring, it is, like Ring: Kanzenban, very faithful to the original novel series.

American films
In 2002, an English-language remake was made, titled The Ring, where the killer is renamed as Samara Morgan, who is a preteen instead of an adult. The Ring was one of the highest-grossing horror remakes, its box office gross surpassing that of Ring. Two sequels were made, including a short film.  

The Ring was released on 18 October 2002. The film follows journalist Rachel Keller as she investigates a videotape that may have killed four teenagers (including her niece). There is an urban legend about this tape: the viewer will die seven days after watching it. If the legend is correct, Rachel would have to run against time to save her son's and her own.

A short film, Rings was released on 8 March 2005, originally as part of the DVD set of the first film. Jake Pierce, a young teenager, watches a cursed video tape after joining a teen cult named "Rings".

The Ring Two was released on 18 March 2005. High school student Jake Pierce tries to make his girlfriend Emily watch the cursed videotape. After discovering that Emily covered her eyes and didn't watch the tape, he is killed by Samara Morgan. Rachel Keller learns of Jake's death and realizes she has to save her son Aidan from Samara.

Rings was released on 3 February 2017. The story follows Julia who becomes worried about her boyfriend when he explores a dark subculture surrounding a mysterious videotape said to kill the watcher seven days after they view the tape. Her actions lead her to make a horrifying discovery: there is a "movie within the movie" that no one has ever seen before.

Future
In September 2019, The Grudge director Nicolas Pesce expressed interest in a crossover film between The Grudge and the English-language The Ring film series.

Japanese cast and crew

Cast
A  indicates the actor portrayed the role of a younger version of the character.
A  indicates the actor or actress portrayed their film character as possessed by another.
An  indicates an appearance through archival footage.
A indicates a cameo appearance.

A dark gray cell indicates the character was not in the film.

Crew

American cast and crew

Cast
A  indicates the actor portrayed the role of a younger version of the character.
A  indicates the actor or actress lent only his or her voice for his or her film character.
A  indicates the actor or actress portrayed their film character as possessed by another.
An  indicates an appearance through archival footage.
A  indicates a cameo appearance.

A dark gray cell indicates the character was not in the film.

Crew

Reception
The original 1991 novel Ring sold 500,000 copies by January 1998, and 1.5million copies by July 2000.

Box office performance

Critical and audience response

In his review of Sadako (2019), the film critic and psychoanalyst Pieter-Jan Van Haecke remarked that while Sadako does not work as a horror movie, the atmospheric tension that marks the films turn the film into an enjoyable experience.

Unofficial  films
In 2015, Hikiko-san vs Sadako (or simply Hikiko vs Sadako), directed by Nagaoka Hisaaki was released. While the DVD cover features a character resembling Sadako emerging from a well, the character in the film is named Sadako Takamura.

In 2016 and 2017, Bunshinsaba vs. Sadako and Bunshinsaba vs Sadako 2, both directed by River Huang, a crossover with the Bunshinsaba film series, were released. A third film, Bunshinsaba vs Sadako 3, was originally scheduled for release in 2020, but was delayed and its release date is unknown.

The Return of Sadako, released in 2018, was the first stand-alone Chinese Ring film to be made following the crossover film Bunshinaba vs. Sadako in 2016; produced by Scarecrow Pictures, the film's killers are renamed as sisters Sadako and Kawako, who flee to China alongside their father after the outbreak of the Second Sino-Japanese War, before turning against one another for the love of a Japanese boy; years later a projector is discovered in their house with their souls imprinted upon it. Though the film was marketed as an unofficial sequel to Sadako 3D 2, it is in-fact a remake.

Notes

References

 
Horror film franchises
Kadokawa Dwango franchises
Japanese supernatural horror films
Japanese serial killer films
Japanese ghost films
Fiction about curses
Films about journalism
Films about television
Japanese horror films
Film series introduced in 1995
DreamWorks Pictures films
Paramount Pictures franchises
Mass media franchises introduced in 1991